Hazur Sahib Nanded - Jammu Tawi Humsafar Express is an AC super-fast express train of the Indian Railways connecting  in Maharashtra and  in Jammu and Kashmir. It is currently being operated with 12751/12752 train numbers on a weekly basis.

Coach composition 

The train is completely 3-tier AC sleeper designed by Indian Railways with features of LED screen display to show information about stations, train speed etc. and will have announcement system as well, Vending machines for tea, coffee and milk, Bio toilets in compartments as well as CCTV cameras.

Service

It averages 55 km/hr as 12751/Hazur Sahib Nanded - Jammu Tawi Humsafar Express starts on Friday from  covering 2049 km in 37 hrs & 55 km/hr as 12752/Jammu Tawi - Hazur Sahib Nanded Humsafar Express starts on Sunday from  covering 2049 km in 37 hrs 20 min.

Traction

This train hauled by a Pune Diesel Loco Shed based WDP 4D locomotive from NED to AK. From AK to JAT it is hauled by Ghaziabad Electric Loco Shed based WAP 7 locomotive and vice versa.

Route & Halts

See also

 Indore - Puri Humsafar Express
 Humsafar Express

References

External links 

 12751/Hazur Sahib Nanded - Jammu Tawi Humsafar Express
 12752/Jammu Tawi - Hazur Sahib Nanded Humsafar Express

Humsafar Express trains
Transport in Nanded
Transport in Jammu
Rail transport in Madhya Pradesh
Rail transport in Uttar Pradesh
Rail transport in Delhi
Rail transport in Maharashtra
Rail transport in Haryana
Rail transport in Punjab, India
Rail transport in Jammu and Kashmir
Railway services introduced in 2018